The Romania national under-21 football team, also known as Romania under-21s or Romania U21(s), is considered to be the feeder team for the Romania national football team.

This team is for Romanian players aged under 21 at the start of the calendar year in which a two-year European Under-21 Football Championship campaign begins, so some players can remain with the squad until the age of 23. As long as they are eligible, players can play for Romania at any level, making it possible to play for the U21s, senior side, and again for the U21s. It is also possible to play for one country at youth level and another at senior level (providing the player has not played a senior competitive game in his previous country.)

The U-21 team came into existence, following the realignment of UEFA's youth competitions, in 1976. Romania qualified for the 1998 UEFA European Under-21 Championship, and under Victor Pițurcă reached the quarter-finals, where they were knocked out by the Netherlands. Romania had been 1–0 up, but were eventually beaten 2–1. The Romanian lineup included players like: Cosmin Contra, Bogdan Lobonț, Cătălin Munteanu, Ionel Dănciulescu and Ion Luțu.

Romania once again qualified unbeaten for the finals after topping their group in the qualifying series. The Romanians reached semi-final of the UEFA European Under-21 Championship for the first time in their history in the 2019 UEFA Under-21 Euro but eventually lost 4–2 to defending champions Germany who scored twice in the dying moments. Romania qualified for the 2020 Summer Olympics for their first Olympics since 1964. Overall, Romania was a revelation at the tournament, beating both England and Croatia (4-2 and 4–1), and looked on course for a shock before Germany fought back to make the final.

Romania U21s do not have a permanent home. They play in stadia dotted all around Romania, in an attempt to encourage younger fans in all areas of the country to get behind Romania. Because of the lower demand compared to the senior national team, smaller grounds can be used.

Competitive record

UEFA U-21 Championship Record

Olympic Games
Football at the Summer Olympics was first played officially in 1908. The Olympiads between 1896 and 1980 was only open for amateur players. The 1984 and 1988 tournaments were open to players with no appearances in the FIFA World Cup. After the 1988 Olympics, the football event was changed into a tournament for U23 or U21 teams with a maximum of three older players. See Romania national football team for competition record from 1908 until 1988.

*Denotes draws include knockout matches decided on penalty kicks.
**Includes both qualification phase and final tournament of UEFA European Under-21 Football Championship.
***Gold background color indicates that the tournament was won. Red border color indicates tournament was held on home soil.

EURO 2021

Results and fixtures

2020

2021

2022

Players

Current squad

Recent call-ups
The following players have also been called up to the Romania under-21 squad and remain eligible:

Notes
INJ = Player withdrew from the squad due to an injury
SUS = Player is serving suspension
WD = Player withdrew from the squad
COV = Player withdrawn from the squad due to positive COVID-19 test
Names in italics denote players that have been capped for the Senior team.

Coaching staff
As of September 2020.

See also
Romania national football team
Romania Olympic football team

Footnotes

References

External links
UEFA Under-21 website Contains full results archive
The Rec.Sport.Soccer Statistics Foundation Contains full record of U-21/U-23 Championships.
FRF.ro

European national under-21 association football teams
Football